Duplessis is a French surname. Notable people with the name include:

Georges Duplessis, a French art historian
Jerry Duplessis, a composer and record producer
José María Imbert Duplessis (1798–1847), a French-born Dominican Republic independence war commandant and national hero
Joseph Duplessis, a French painter
Lucile Duplessis, a French Revolutionary figure, wife of Camille Desmoulins
Marie Duplessis, a French courtesan and mistress
Maurice Duplessis (1890-1959), a premier of Québec in the mid twentieth century
Rachel Blau DuPlessis (b. 1941), an American poet and editor of George Oppen's Selected Letters
Thomas Duplessis (born Thomas-Antoine de Mauduit du Plessis) (1753–1791), a French officer who fought with the Continental Army during the American Revolutionary War

Surnames of French origin